Tlass is a surname. Notable people with the surname include:

Firas Tlass (born 1960), Syrian business tycoon
Manaf Tlass (born 1964), Syrian brigadier general
Mustafa Tlass (1932–2017), Syrian military officer and politician